Škocjan is a small settlement in the Municipality of Divača in the Littoral region of Slovenia. Nearby Škocjan Caves is named after the village.

The local church is dedicated to Saint Cantianius and belongs to the parish of Rodik.

References

External links

Škocjan on Geopedia

Populated places in the Municipality of Divača